FC Presnya Moscow was a Russian football team based in Moscow. It was founded in 1978 as FC Krasnaya Presnya Moscow. It participated in the third-tier Soviet Second League and was notable for giving the start for the careers of Oleg Romantsev, Vasili Kulkov and Aleksandr Mostovoi.

History
In 1990, when perestroika policies allowed the creation of private enterprises in the Soviet Union, the club was purchased by an Iraqi businessman Hussam Al-Khalidi who renamed the club to Asmaral (after the initials of his three children – daughters Asil and Mariam and son Alan). It was the first privately owned club in Russia. Al-Khalidi hired an acclaimed coach Konstantin Beskov and a former Spartak Moscow star Yuri Gavrilov. After the 1991 season, the club was promoted to the second-tier Soviet First League. However, due to the dissolution of the USSR, the new Russian league system was organized, and Asmaral was accepted into the top-flight Russian Top Division, where it reached the 7th place in the inaugural 1992 season. In the next 1993 season, it was relegated to the Russian First Division, then suffered two consecutive relegations in 1995 and 1996, ending up in the Russian Third Division. Following the 1998 season, it lost the professional status (entering amateur leagues) and was dissolved altogether after the 1999 season, and being declared bankrupt in September 2003.

Asmaral's farm club participated in the Russian Second League and Russian Third League in 1992 as FC Asmaral-d Moscow and from 1993 to 1995 as FC Presnya Moscow.

A separate club called FC Presnya Moscow participated on the professional level in the Russian Second Division from 2004 to 2006.

League and cup

Notable players
Had international caps for their respective countries. Players whose name is listed in bold represented their countries while playing for Asmaral/Krasnaya Presnya.

USSR/Russia
 Yuri Gavrilov
   Vasili Kulkov
   Aleksandr Mostovoi
 Aleksandr Prokhorov

 Sergey Rodionov
 Andrei Yakubik
 Sergey Grishin

 Sergei Semak
 Aleksandr Tochilin

Former USSR countries
 Algimantas Briaunis

References

 
Defunct football clubs in Moscow
Association football clubs established in 1978
Association football clubs disestablished in 1999
1978 establishments in Russia
1999 disestablishments in Russia